Mirnes Sead Šišić (born 8 August 1981) is a former Slovenian footballer.

Club career

Early career
Šišić began his professional footballing career in Slovenia with NK Rudar Velenje in 2001. In 2003, Šišić signed with Ilisiakos F.C. in Greece. After one season with Ilisiakos, Šišić's career continued to progress in Greece.  Šišić moved on to Larissa and then Levadiakos (with a short loan spell at Iraklis, and, after a strong start to the 2007–08 season with Levadiakos, Greece's most successful club, Olympiacos swooped for the Slovenian winger.

Olympiacos
Šišić made his Olympiacos debut in January 2008 in a 2–1 win against one of his former clubs, Iraklis, in Thessaloniki.

In March 2008, Šišić made his first and only appearance in the UEFA Champions League, coming on as a substitute in a 3–0 loss to Chelsea at Stamford Bridge in the first knockout stage of the competition.

Later that month, Šišić scored his first Olympiacos goal, in a 2–0 win against Atromitos which led to a 2–0 win.

In total, Šišić made 12 league appearances and scored two goals for Olympiakos in 2007–08, as the club won the Super League championship.

Red Star Belgrade
In 2007–08, Šišić played under Greek manager Takis Lemonis, and, after Lemonis was sacked in March 2008, Spanish manager José Segura. In the summer, Segura was replaced by another his countryman Ernesto Valverde.  Šišić found playing time difficult to come by under Valverde, and by the winter he had not made a league appearance. During the winter transfer period, Šišić and Olympiacos decided to part ways, and the Slovenian signed with Serbian giants Red Star Belgrade

Šišić made his league debut with Red Star in February 2009 in a derby against Partizan Belgrade. In total, Šišić made 12 appearances for Red Star during the second half of the 2008–09 season.

PAS Giannina
In January 2010, Šišić returned to Greece, signing for Super League club PAS Giannina.  Šišić made 15 appearances and scored 2 goals for Giannina during the second half of the 2009–10 season.

International career
Soon after being signed by Olympiacos, Šišić was called up to the Slovenia national team. He scored his first goal in only his second capthe only goal in a 1–0 victory against Hungary. He scored his second from the penalty spot in a friendly loss to Croatia.

In 2008 and 2009, made 5 appearances (all) starts in 2010 FIFA World Cup qualification matches, helping Slovenia qualify for the 2010 FIFA World Cup.

Honours

Olympiacos

Greek Super League: 2007–08
Greek Cup: 2007–08

International goals

See also
Slovenian international players

External links
Player profile at NZS 

1981 births
Living people
Sportspeople from Celje
Slovenian footballers
Association football wingers
Athlitiki Enosi Larissa F.C. players
Ilisiakos F.C. players
Iraklis Thessaloniki F.C. players
Olympiacos F.C. players
Levadiakos F.C. players
PAS Giannina F.C. players
Red Star Belgrade footballers
Panetolikos F.C. players
OFI Crete F.C. players
NK Rudar Velenje players
Slovenian PrvaLiga players
Serbian SuperLiga players
Super League Greece players
Slovenian expatriate footballers
Expatriate footballers in Greece
Slovenian expatriate sportspeople in Serbia
Expatriate footballers in Serbia
Slovenian expatriate sportspeople in Greece
Slovenia international footballers